Lachlan Bronnach MacLean, was the 7th Chief of Clan MacLean.

Biography
Lachlan, seventh chief of MacLean, received the sobriquet of "Bronnach", or swag-bellied, on account of his corpulence. He was with his father on the fatal field of Harlaw, where he was made prisoner by Alexander Stewart, Earl of Mar. During his captivity, he became acquainted with the earl's daughter, the Lady Margaret, whom he afterward married. It is not probable that he remained in confinement for any considerable length of time. He did not possess the same war-like character that distinguished his father. He appears neither to have sought, nor avoided war, but was ready for action when the time arrived.

His name, does not come prominently forward until the year 1427, when war was brought through the actions of King James I. James summoned a parliament to meet him at Inverness, in 1427, at which the Highland chiefs were invited to attend. As the chiefs entered the hall in which parliament was assembled, each was immediately arrested and placed in irons in different parts of the building, not one being permitted to communicate with any of the others. Two of the chiefs were immediately beheaded, and the rest sent to various prisons, where after a time some were liberated, and the rest put to death.

In 1429, Lachlan was summoned by the young Lord of the Isles, to assist him in avenging this unparalleled outrage. Joined by the Lord's other vassals, they advanced against the town of Inverness, which they burnt to the ground; they also laid waste to certain crown lands. King James I immediately placed himself at the head of a large army, and launched a surprise attack; Alexander, Lachlan, and Alexander's other vassals, were forced to surrender unconditionally, and were imprisoned in Tantallon Castle.

Marriage and children
Before marriage he had a child with the daughter of MacEarchorn MacLean of Kingerloch:
Donald Maclean, 1st Laird of Ardgour sometimes called Mac-Mhic-Eachainn Chinnghearloch. He was born out of wedlock and brought up among his mother's people.
By his first wife, Margaret, daughter of the Earl of Mar, possibly Alexander Stewart, Earl of Mar, he had:
Lachlan Og Maclean, his heir and successor as 8th Clan Chief.
By his second wife, Fionnaghal, daughter of William MacLeod of Harris, he had two sons:
Neil Maclean of Ross
John Garbh Maclean, 1st Laird of Coll

Notes

References

Year of birth missing
Year of death missing
Lachlan
15th-century Scottish people